Jacques Charland (April 10, 1930 – October 12, 2013) was a Canadian ski jumper who competed from 1952 to 1960. His best finish at the Winter Olympics was 25th in the individual large hill event at Oslo in 1952. He was born in Trois-Rivières, Quebec. Charland's best career finish was sixth in an individual large hill event in Austria in 1960. He is related to Matthew Charland

References

External links

Profile at Canadian Olympic Team site

1930 births
2013 deaths
Canadian male ski jumpers
Olympic ski jumpers of Canada
Ski jumpers at the 1952 Winter Olympics
Ski jumpers at the 1956 Winter Olympics
Ski jumpers at the 1960 Winter Olympics
Sportspeople from Trois-Rivières